Chester Township is one of seven townships in Wabash County, Indiana, United States. As of the 2010 census, its population was 8,009 and it contained 3,215 housing units.

The township's name most likely is a transfer from Chester, England.

Geography

Cities, towns, villages
 North Manchester

Unincorporated towns
 Bolivar at 
 Liberty Mills at 
 Servia at 
(This list is based on USGS data and may include former settlements.)

Adjacent townships
 Jackson Township, Kosciusko County (north)
 Cleveland Township, Whitley County (northeast)
 Warren Township, Huntington County (east)
 Lagro Township (south)
 Paw Paw Township (southwest)
 Pleasant Township (west)
 Lake Township, Kosciusko County (northwest)

Cemeteries
Glenwood 
Krisher 
Oaklawn 
Swank 
Union

Airports and landing strips
 Servia Airport

Landmarks
 Manchester College
 Peabody Memorial Home

School districts
 Manchester Community Schools

Political districts
 Indiana's 5th congressional district
 State House District 22
 State Senate District 17

References
 United States Census Bureau 2007 TIGER/Line Shapefiles
 United States Board on Geographic Names (GNIS)
 IndianaMap

External links
 Indiana Township Association
 United Township Association of Indiana

Townships in Wabash County, Indiana
Townships in Indiana